Events from the year 1752 in art.

Events
 1 March – Scottish painter Allan Ramsay elopes with and marries, as his second wife, the Jacobite heiress Margaret Lindsay.
 A fire at Kremsier (modern-day Kroměříž in Moravia) destroys the originals of three 16th century paintings made by Hans Holbein the Younger in England: Sir Thomas More and his family, The Triumph of Wealth and The Triumph of Poverty.

Works

 François Boucher
 Allegory of Music
 Marie-Louise O'Murphy (approximate date)
 A Reclining Nymph Playing The Flute With Putti, Perhaps The Muse Euterpe
 Canaletto
 Northumberland House
 Warwick Castle, the East Front from the Outer Court (Birmingham Museum and Art Gallery, England)
 Jean-Honoré Fragonard – Jeroboam Sacrificing to Idols
 Jean-Marc Nattier – Baronne Rigoley d'Ogny as Aurora
 Louis-François Roubiliac – Monument to John Montagu, 2nd Duke of Montagu (marble, Warkton church, Northamptonshire, England)
 Gaspare Traversi
 Murder during Meal at the House of Absalom (Absalom murders Amnon) (Basilica of Saint Paul Outside the Walls, Rome)
 The Wound (Gallerie dell'Accademia, Venice)

Births
 January 1 – Betsy Ross, American flag designer and seamstress (died 1836)
 January 18 – Josiah Boydell, British publisher and painter (died 1817)
 February 5 – Jean Grandjean, Dutch painter, draftsman and watercolourist (died 1781)
 April 4 – Jean-Pierre Saint-Ours, Swiss painter (died 1809)
 April 21 – Humphry Repton, English garden designer and artist (died 1818)
 August 21 – Antonio Cavallucci, Italian painter (died 1795)
 September – George Keith Ralph, British portrait painter (died 1811)
 September 28 – John the Painter, born James Aitken, painter turned terrorist in British naval dockyards in 1776–77 (hanged 1777)
 date unknown
 John Robert Cozens, English draftsman and painter of romantic watercolor landscapes (died 1797)
 George Farington, English artist (died 1788)
Rosalie Filleul, French painter (died 1794)
 Jean-Baptiste Giraud, French sculptor (died 1830)
 Luke Havell, English engraver, etcher and painter (died 1810)
 Torii Kiyonaga, Japanese ukiyo-e printmaker and painter of the Torii school (died 1815)
 1752/1753: William Baillie, British artist working in India (died 1799)
 1752/1754: Abraham Abramson, Prussian coiner and medallist (died 1811)

Deaths
 January 11 – Johann Jakob Frey the Elder, Swiss engraver (born 1681)
 January 26 – Jean-François de Troy, French painter (born 1679)
 April 6 – Friedrich Christian Glume, German sculptor (born 1714)
 March 21 – Gio Nicola Buhagiar, Maltese painter (born 1698)
 May 4 – Pieter Snyers, Flemish art collector, painter, draughtsman and engraver (born 1681)
 May 24 – Charles Parrocel, French painter and engraver and a specialist in battle and hunting scenes (born 1688)
 June 15 – Charles-Antoine Coypel, French painter, art commentator and playwright (born 1694)
 June 29 – Antonio Corradini, Venetian Rococo sculptor (born 1688)
 June 30 – James Seymour, English painter of equestrian subjects (born 1702)
 October 20 (bur.) – William Verelst, English painter of portraits, still lifes and birds (born 1704)
 date unknown
 Jacopo Amigoni, Italian painter known for mythological figures and religious artifacts, best known for his initial work in Venice (born 1682)
 Bian Shoumin, Chinese painter in Qing Dynasty (born 1684)
 probable - Robert Feke, American painter (born ca. 1705)

References

 
Years of the 18th century in art
1750s in art